William Potts may refer to:

 William Potts (inventor) (1883–1947), American policeman and inventor of modern traffic lights
 William E. Potts (1921–2005), American army general
 William Estel Potts (1935–2004), American army general
William Potts (1809–?), British clockmaker and founder of Potts of Leeds

See also 
 Bill Potts (disambiguation), several people
 William Potts Dewees (1768–1841), American obstetrician and medical writer